Bijar County is in Kurdistan province, Iran. The capital of the county is the city of Bijar. At the 2006 census, the county's population was 95,461 in 23,614 households. The following census in 2011 counted 93,714 people in 26,068 households. At the 2016 census, the county's population was 89,162 in 27,759 households.

Administrative divisions

The population history and structural changes of Bijar County's administrative divisions over three consecutive censuses are shown in the following table. The latest census shows three districts, 11 rural districts, and five cities.

References

 

Counties of Kurdistan Province